Charles Christian Ralph "Ces" Dacre (15 May 1899 – 2 November 1975) was a cricketer from New Zealand who also represented New Zealand in football (soccer). He played in the Auckland and Gloucestershire cricket teams and was in New Zealand's first team to go to England in 1927, though no Tests were played on the tour.

Rugby career
Dacre played rugby union in the war years for the Railway club (a wartime combination of the Marist and City clubs). In 1917 he was involved in a breakaway movement from the club that switched to rugby league, playing matches against Ponsonby United and the City Rovers. Railway XIII merged with Grafton Athletic for the 1918 Auckland Rugby League season, though it is not known whether Dacre was still with the club.

Cricket career
Dacre was a hard-hitting, somewhat impetuous, right-handed middle order batsman and an occasional slow left-arm bowler, who also kept wicket a few times in a first-class career that spanned more than 20 years. An outstanding schoolboy cricketer, he made his debut for Auckland when only 15 and appeared regularly for the team until the 1927–28 season, and then again in two matches in 1932–33.

He toured Australia twice and England once with New Zealand cricket teams in the period before New Zealand played Tests. In 1927, in a strong batting side, he was a success with 1,070 runs at an average of 31.47 in the first-class matches. In the first innings of the match against Marylebone Cricket Club he scored 107 in an hour and a half. Though he returned to New Zealand the following winter, in 1928 he was back in England where he spent two years playing occasional cricket before becoming qualified to play County Championship matches for Gloucestershire.

Winning a regular place for Gloucestershire as soon as he was qualified in 1930, he made more than 1,000 runs in each of the next six seasons, though his average declined steadily over the period. His best season was 1930, when he hit his highest score, 223, with five sixes and 25 fours, in 255 minutes against Worcestershire. He scored two centuries in the match against Worcestershire in 1933. By 1935, he was averaging no more than 21 runs an innings and when his form declined further in 1936 his contract was terminated by mutual agreement and he returned to New Zealand.

Football career
Dacre also represented New Zealand in football, appearing in 4 A-Internationals in 1922 and 1923, scoring 2 goals. Dacre was also a member of the North Shore side who reached the 1926 Chatham Cup final, losing 4–2 to Sunnyside.

References

External links
 

1899 births
1975 deaths
Association football forwards
Auckland cricketers
Cricketers from Auckland
Gloucestershire cricketers
L. H. Tennyson's XI cricket team
New Zealand association footballers
New Zealand cricketers
New Zealand international footballers
New Zealand rugby league players
New Zealand rugby union players
North Island cricketers
North v South cricketers
Players cricketers
Pre-1930 New Zealand representative cricketers
Rugby league players from Auckland